, or Sword Oratoria for short, is a Japanese light novel side story series, written by Fujino Ōmori and illustrated by Kiyotaka Haimura (based on the designs by Suzuhito Yasuda). The story focuses on the female character Ais Wallenstein from the parent Is It Wrong to Try to Pick Up Girls in a Dungeon? series.

Overview

Setting
Adventurers visit the dungeon to defeat monsters and take their crystal shards, which are used to craft magic items, among other treasures; however, they can also be exchanged for the world's currency. The people of Orario join groups called , who serve a range of functions from dungeon crawling to crafting items. Each Familia is named after and serves a resident deity. In a fashion similar to role playing games, the adventurers are grouped into levels, increasing their levels and abilities according to their achievements.

Plot

The story follows the same time-frame as Is It Wrong to Try to Pick Up Girls in a Dungeon?, but this time centers on the Loki Familia. It highlights events of the Loki Familia that were only mentioned in the main story, overlapping with events from it.

Media

Light novel
A side story light novel series titled , written by Fujino Ōmori with illustrations by Kiyotaka Haimura (based on the designs by Suzuhito Yasuda), was first published on January 15, 2014. Fourteen volumes have been published as of March 15, 2023. This series focuses on Ais Wallenstein as the main character.

Manga
A manga adaptation of the light novel series, with art by Takashi Yagi, began serialization in Square Enix's shōnen manga magazine Gangan Joker from May 22, 2014. Yen Press later licensed the manga series to be released in North America.

Anime
An anime television series adaptation of the Sword Oratoria light novels aired from April 14, 2017 to June 30, 2017. The series is directed by Yōhei Suzuki and written by Hideki Shirane, with animation by J.C.Staff, character designs by Shigeki Kimoto and music by Keiji Inai. The series ran for 12 episodes. Sentai Filmworks have licensed the series and simulcasted the series on Amazon Anime Strike. MVM Films will release the series in the United Kingdom. Yuka Iguchi performed for the opening theme titled "RE-ILLUSION".

Reception
The anime adaptation of Sword Oratoria has received mixed reviews. In a review of the first episode, Rebecca Silverman from Anime News Network gave it a B+ grade. Silverman stated that while the first episode was a good way of getting into the story's world, it did not focus on the protagonist Aiz Wallenstein as much as expected.

Note

References

External links
  
  
  
 

2017 anime television series debuts
2014 Japanese novels
Adventure anime and manga
Anime and manga based on light novels
Anime Strike
Fantasy anime and manga
GA Bunko
Gangan Comics manga
J.C.Staff
Light novels
Sentai Filmworks
Shōnen manga
Yen Press titles